Łyszkowice  is a village in Łowicz County, Łódź Voivodeship, in central Poland. It is the seat of the gmina (administrative district) called Gmina Łyszkowice.

The village has a population of 1,100.

Notable individuals
Łyszkowice is a place of birth of the World War II member of Armia Krajowa, Holocaust resistor and author Franciszek Ząbecki who testified at the trials of German war criminals Kurt Franz and the commandant of Treblinka extermination camp, Franz Stangl. Ząbecki proved that the "Güterwagen" boxcars crammed with Jewish prisoners on the way to Treblinka, were returning empty.

References

 Central Statistical Office (GUS) Population: Size and Structure by Administrative Division - (2007-12-31) (in Polish)

Villages in Łowicz County